Raymond Rodgers Belmont (July 19, 1863 – January 31, 1887) was a champion polo player who killed himself in 1887 with a gunshot.

Biography
He was born on July 19, 1863, to August Belmont and Caroline Slidell Mackenzie Perry. He attended Harvard University.

He participated in the 1886 International Polo Cup with teammates William Knapp Thorn, Foxhall Parker Keene and Thomas Hitchcock, Sr.

He died on January 31, 1887, in New York City, New York by shooting himself in the side of the head with a pistol.  He was 23 years old. He was buried in the Common Burying Ground and Island Cemetery in Newport, Rhode Island.

External links

References

1863 births
1887 deaths
American people of German-Jewish descent
American polo players
Belmont family
Suicides by firearm in New York City
Burials at Common Burying Ground and Island Cemetery
Harvard University alumni
International Polo Cup
Perry family
1880s suicides